Interstate 69C (I-69C) is a north–south freeway running through South Texas. Once complete, the freeway (with connections to Mexican Federal Highway 97) will begin at I-2/U.S. Highway 83 (US 83) in Pharr and head northward before terminating at I-69W/US 59 in George West near I-37. For its entire length, I-69C shares its alignment with US 281. , only an  segment has been completed at the route's southern terminus in Pharr.

Route description
Interstate 69C begins at a partially-completed stack interchange with Interstate 2/U.S. Highway 83 and North Cage Boulevard (U.S. Highway 281) in the northern part of Pharr, Texas. As of December 2022, I-69C only has direct connections from its southbound lanes to westbound (Exit 1A) and eastbound (Exit 1B) I-2/U.S. 83 and flyover ramps coming from either direction of I-2/U.S. 83 to I-69C northbound; traffic approaching the interchange from the south on U.S. 281, or wamting to head south on U.S. 281 from the interchange, can only access either Interstate via its frontage roads, and vice versa. This can be disorienting for traffic wishing to continue south on U.S. 281 from I-69C toward downtown Pharr and Hidalgo or north from the same; TxDOT is currently working to finish out the interchange.

Immediately north of I-2, North Cage Boulevard splits into a one-way couplet and sandwiches mainline I-69C in between, with N. Cage Boulevard, still carrying U.S. 281 at this point, serving as a frontage road. The parallel roads head north past East Ferguson Avenue (SH 495); the frontage roads intersect it; the freeway crosses over on an overpass. Beyond it to the north, a southbound off-ramp (Exit 1C) provides access to TX 495 and U.S. 281 beyond I-69C's current southern terminus. Northbound, an onramp from N. Cage Boulevard carries U.S. 281 onto the Interstate's mainline. The two routes are coterminous from this point for the entire current length of I-69C.

After another pair of on-ramps from N. Cage Boulevard and a southbound off-ramp to Sioux Road (Exit 1D), the road enters Edinburg. I-69C provides access to FM 3461 (Nolana Loop) via a single northbound offramp (Exit 1E) before coming to its first full diamond interchange, with U.S. 281 Business, which continues north on a reunited N. Cage Boulevard through central Edinburg on U.S. 281's former routing; meanwhile I-69C/U.S. 281 curves to the northeast for about two miles before it turns due north again. After reuniting with Bus. U.S. 281 on the northern edge of town, I-69C leaves Edinburg, skirting the small community of Faysville on its western flank before terminating at its overpass over FM 490 (Exit 17). The freeway downgrades to an expressway beyond here and continues on as U.S. 281.

History

The Federal Highway Administration (FHWA) approved the designation for the South Rio Grande Valley Segment on May 24, 2013, and the Texas Transportation Commission followed suit on May 30, 2013. This action finalized the designations of not only I-69C but also of the sections of I-69E from Brownsville north to north of Raymondville and also I-2 which is a  freeway connecting with I-69C and I-69E in Pharr and Harlingen. The signage was installed in summer 2013.

, the cluster consisting of the recently designated portions of I-69C, I-69E, and I-2 in the Rio Grande Valley is not connected to the national Interstate network. This situation is slated to be remedied by scheduled projects to complete I-69E along US 77 between Raymondville and Robstown and the southern end of the previously signed portion of the I-69 corridor connecting with I-37 west of Corpus Christi. The Environmental Protection Agency (EPA) approval for the upgrade of the US 77 alignment to Interstate standards, including bypasses of the towns along the  routing, was obtained through a Finding of No Significant Impact statement issued on July 13, 2012; funding for the various upgrade projects became available after 2015. During August 2014, exit numbering began on the south most segment in Edinburg.

, the only segment of US 281 to be constructed to Interstate standards not currently connected to I-69C is the segment through Falfurrias. A bypass for Premont is under construction and is expected to be finished by October 2023.

Exit list

See also

References

External links

C
U.S. Route 281
Interstate Highways in Texas
Interstate 69C
Interstate 69C
Interstate 69C
Interstate 69C